Ken Sagoes is an American actor. He is best known for his role as Roland Kincaid in the fantasy horror film A Nightmare on Elm Street 3: Dream Warriors (1987) and the sequel A Nightmare on Elm Street 4: The Dream Master (1988). Sagoes portrayed Darryl in the television show What's Happening Now!! He has made guest appearances on shows such as The Twilight Zone (Episode: "But Can She Type?"), Night Court, My So-Called Life, Martin, The Parkers, The Division, and The District.

Filmography

Film

Television

Awards and recognition
2008: NAACP Theatre Award nomination for Best Supporting Male - Local, George Washington's Boy

References

External links

Year of birth missing (living people)
Living people
African-American male actors
American male film actors
American male television actors
Male actors from Atlanta
21st-century African-American people
20th-century African-American people